The Iven C. Kincheloe Award recognizes outstanding professional accomplishment in the conduct of flight testing. It was established in 1958 by the Society of Experimental Test Pilots in memory of test pilot and Korean War ace Iven C. Kincheloe, United States Air Force, who died during flight testing.

The Kincheloe Trophy consists of four columns and a symbolic aerospace vehicle that points toward the shield of the society. The columns represent the foundation on which the society was created—courage, integrity, knowledge, and accomplishment. The vehicle reinforces the role played by the society in the development of aerospace systems. Plaques bearing the name of each honoree are mounted around the sides of the onyx base.

Criteria 
The Society lists three criteria for nominations to this award:

The recipient must be a living member of the Society.
The accomplishment, or significant portion of the accomplishment, must have occurred in the past year (From July 1)
The accomplishment must involve actual flight testing conducted by the individual, while in a test pilot role, and represent an outstanding contribution to an aerospace program.

Recipients 
Recipients of this award, from 1958 to present, include:

1958 
James R. Gannett, Boeing First Commercial Jet
Joseph John "Tym" Tymczyszyn, CAA First Commercial Jet
1959
Robert G. Ferry, Maj USAF, XV-3 convertiplane
1960 
A. Scott Crossfield, North American X-15 Program
William M. Magruder, Douglas DC-8 Flight Test Program
1961 
Joseph A. Walker, NASA X-15 Program
Robert M. White, Maj USAF, NASA X-15 Program
1962 
Donald W. McCracken, McDonnell F-4 Mach Investigation
1963 
Astronaut Team, NASA Mercury Program
M. Scott Carpenter, LCDR USN
L. Gordon Cooper, Maj USAF
John H. Glenn, Jr. Lt Col USMC
Virgil I. Grissom, Capt USAF
Walter M. Schirra, CDR USN
Alan B. Shepard, CDR USN
Donald K. Slayton, Maj USAF
1964 
Pilots of YF12A (A-11) Lockheed Super-Secret Project
Louis W. Schalk
William C. Park
Robert J. Gilliland
James D. Eastham
1965 
Alvin S. White, North American XB-70 Supersonic Flight
1966 
Milton Orville Thompson, NASA M2/F2-Lifting Body Program
1967 
Richard L. Johnson, for the General Dynamics F-111 test Program
1968 
Drury W. Wood, Jr, Dornier Werke DO31 Test Program-VTOL Flight
1969
Jerauld R. Gentry, Maj USAF, NASA/FRC Lifting Body Program
James A. McDivitt, Col USAF/NASA Apollo IX Mission, test of LM maneuvering
1970
Darryl G. Greenamyer, Lockheed World speed record for piston engine airplane
Apollo 11 Team Moon landing and return
Neil A. Armstrong NASA
Edwin E. Aldrin, Col USAF/NASA
Michael Collins, Col USAF/NASA
1971 
Andre Turcat, Aerospatiale, Concorde joint test program
Brian Trubshaw, British Aircraft Corporation, Concorde joint test program
1972 
Apollo XVI Crew Moon landing and return
John W. Young, CAPT USN, NASA
Thomas K. Mattingly CDR USN/NASA
Charles M. Duke, Lt Col USAF/NASA
Donald R. Segner, Lockheed-California For accomplishments in Company testing the Cheyenne helicopter
1973 
Charles A. Sewell, Grumman Aerospace Spin Prevention Testing in a Grumman F-14A Tomcat.
1974 
Irving L. Burrows, McDonnell Aircraft Outstanding professional Company contributions as a test pilot during F15A development program
1975 
John E. Krings, McDonnell Aircraft As Project Pilot on F15A Company high angle of attack characteristics test program
1976 
Charles C. Bock, Jr, Rockwell International For his outstanding accomplishments on the B-1 Program
1977 
Fitzhugh L. Fulton, Jr, NASA/Dryden Flight 747/Space Shuttle Carrier Research Center
1978 
James M. Patton Jr, NASA/Langley Research Stall/Spin Flight Research Center
Fred W. Haise, Jr, NASA/JSC Space Shuttle
Joe H. Engle, Col, USAF
Charles Fullerton, Lt Col USAF
Richard H. Truly, CDR USN
1979 
Philip F. Oestricher, General Dynamics Corp. F-16 Flight Test Program
Robert C. Ettinger, Lt Col USAF
1980 
Dorman A. Cannon, Bell Helicopter Textron Tilt Rotor XV-15
Ronald G. Erhart, Bell Helicopter Textron
1981 
John W. Young, NASA Space Shuttle Columbia
Robert L. Crippen, CAPT USN
1982 
Thomas McMurtry, NASA AD-1 Oblique Wing Program
1983 
John M. Hoffman, Lt Col USAF For Outstanding contribution to the derivative F-15 fighter planes
1984 
Donald L. Bloom, Bell Helicopter 0H-58C helicopter spin phenomena
Charles A. Sewell, Grumman Aerospace Low Altitude high angle Corporation of attack, asymmetric thrust flight test program on the F-14 Tomcat.
1985 
William W. Lowe, McDonnell Douglas AV-8B High Angle of Attack Corporation Test Program
1986 
David A. Kerzie, Lockheed Corp. U-2/TR-1 extremely high altitude investigative and exploratory flights to determine flutter characteristics.
1987 
Guy Mitaux-Maurouard, Avions Marcel Dassault Rafale Flight Test Program
Dick Rutan, Voyager Aircraft, Inc. Successful around-the-world non-stop, non-refueled flight of the Voyager aircraft
Jeana Yeager, Voyager Aircraft, Inc.
1988 
Channing S. Morse, McDonnell Douglas NOTAR Helicopter, Helicopter Company Development Program
1989 
Addison S. Thompson, Rockwell International B-1B high alpha envelope
Randy Gaston, Lt Col USAF, expansion and flight control system development
William C. Park, Jr, Lockheed Aircraft Corp. Research and development
N. Kenneth Dyson, Lt Col USAF, flights of prototype
1990 
Bruce J. Hinds, Jr. Northrop Corporation B-2 Flight Test Program
Richard S. Couch, Col USAF
1991 
Paul Metz, Northrop Corporation YF-23 ATF Prototype
David L. Ferguson, Lockheed Corporation YF-22 ATF Prototype
1992 
Daniel C. Brandenstein, CAPT USN Space Shuttle/Satellite Recovery
1993 
Allan T. Reed, McDonnell Douglas T-45 High Angle of Attack and Corporation Flying Qualities & Spin Evaluation
1994 
Christopher J. Yeo, British Aerospace Eurofighter 2000 Flight Test
Peter Weger, Deutsche Aerospace Program
1995 
John E. Cashman, The Boeing Company 777 Flight Test Program
1996 
Erwin Danuwinata, IPTN Expansion and flight tests leading to FAA/JAA certification
Ken Dyson & Richard G. Thomas, Tacit Blue Program (Retroactive 1982)
Jon S. Beesley, USAF F-117 Combined Test Force, Harold C. Farley Lockheed, David L. Ferguson Lockheed & Thomas A. Morgenfeld Lockheed (Retroactive 1983)
1997 
Douglas B. Shane, Scaled Composites V-Jet II and Vision Aire Vantage
1998
Gary Freeman, Gulfstream Aerospace G-V Certification Test Program
1999 
Mike Melvill, Scaled Composites Proteus high-altitude multimission aircraft
2000 
Jeremy Tracy, GKN Westland Helicopters
2001 
Wg Cdr Rajiv Kothiyal, Indian AF
2002
Herb Moran Bell Helicopter, envelope expansion and aircraft definition of the AH-1Z helicopter.
2003
Thomas L. Macdonald, Bell-Boeing High Rate of Descent (HROD) testing for the V-22 Osprey
2004
Scaled Composites SpaceShipOne Test Team
Mike Melvill
Brian Binnie
Peter Siebold
2005
Randy Neville, Boeing F-22
2006
Norman E. Howell, Boeing, C-17
2007
Jon S. Beesley, Lockheed Martin, F-35A and Bird of Prey Test Team (Retroactive from 1997)
Rudy Haug, Boeing
Doug Benjamin, Boeing
Joe Felock, Boeing
2008
Terry E. Tomeny, Calspan Corporation Eclipse
2009
Peter Siebold, Scaled Composites
2010
Michael Carriker, Boeing
2011
Kevin Bredenbeck, Sikorsky Aircraft, X2 Demonstrator
2012
 Markus Scherdel, Solar Impulse, HB-SIA
2013
 Mark "Forger" Stucky, Scaled Composites Test Pilot for SpaceShipTwo and WhiteKnightTwo
2014
AgustaWestland AW609 Tiltrotor Test Team
Pietro Venanzi
Dan Wells
Paul Edwards
2015
Prospero Uybarreta, Bombardier Commercial Aircraft, C Series and CRJ Series
2016
Scott Martin, Gulfstream Aerospace, GVII-G500/G600
2017
Charles Ellis, Bombardier Flight Test Center, Bombardier CSeries
 2018
 James Payne, Airbus Perlan Project
2019
Evan C. Thomas, Scaled Composites, LLC., Stratolaunch Aircraft
2020
Tom Carr, Garmin, Garmin Emergency Autoland (EAL)
2021
Donald Grove, Bell Textron, V-280 Demonstrator Program
2022
Benjamin Williamson, Sikorsky, A Lockheed Martin Company, S-70 Optionally Piloted Vehicle

See also

 List of aviation awards

References 

Aviation awards
Awards established in 1958